The Kid Super Power Hour with Shazam! is an NBC Saturday-morning cartoon produced by Filmation Studios in 1981. The half-hour show included two cartoon stories, with a variety of live-action wraparound segments.

Hero High featured a group of students attending a high school for superheroes. This was a comedy originally planned to feature the characters from Archie Comics, but during development, production company Filmation terminated their relationship with the publishers, and the characters were turned into more generic versions of the same roles.

Shazam! was based on the DC Comics series of the same name, the adventures of Captain Marvel and his Marvel Family, including Mary Marvel, Captain Marvel Jr., Uncle Marvel, and their tiger, Tawky Tawny. In the show, the team fights enemies like Doctor Sivana, Mister Mind, Black Adam, Mister Atom, Ibac, and more.

From time to time, the characters of one show would appear in the other. Isis from The Secrets of Isis also made a guest appearance in animated form on Hero High.

Episodes

Hero High

Shazam!

Cast

Hero High
 John Berwick - Rex Ruthless
 Jere Fields - Misty Magic
 Linda Gary - Miss Grimm
 Jim Greenleaf - Weatherman
 Christopher Hensel - Captain California
 Maylo McCaslin - Dirty Trixie
 Alan Oppenheimer - Mr. Sampson
 Rebecca Perle - Glorious Gal
 Erika Scheimer - Brat Man
 Lou Scheimer - A.W.O.L.
 Johnny Venocour - Punk Rock

Shazam!
 Barry Gordon - Captain Marvel Jr./Freddy Freeman
 Dawn Jeffory - Mary Marvel/Mary Batson, Freckles Marvel, Aunt Minerva
 Burr Middleton - Captain Marvel/Billy Batson
 Alan Oppenheimer - Uncle Marvel/Uncle Dudley, Doctor Sivana, Tawky Tawny, Shazam
 Norm Prescott - Narrator (uncredited)
 Lou Scheimer - Sterling Morris, Mister Mind, Black Adam, Ibac (uncredited)

Reception
In 1982, The Kid Super Power Hour with Shazam! was nominated for a Young Artist Award for "Best Children's Television Series", while Rebecca Perle won a YAA for "Best Young Actress in a Daytime Series". Two years later, she and Johnny "Punk Rock" Venocour would co-star in Savage Streets.

References

External links
 
 

1980s American animated television series
1981 American television series debuts
1982 American television series endings
American children's animated fantasy television series
American children's animated superhero television series
American television series with live action and animation
Animated television shows based on DC Comics
Captain Marvel (DC Comics) in other media
DC Comics animated television series by Filmation
NBC original programming
Television series by Warner Bros. Television Studios